The El Kala National Park and Biosphere Reserve (Arabic: محمية القالة الوطنية) is one of the national parks of Algeria in the extreme north-east of the country. It is home to several lakes and a unique ecosystem in the Mediterranean basin. Several parts of the park have been designated as protected Ramsar sites.

History
The El Kala National Park and Biosphere Reserve was created by decree n° 83-462 of July 23, 1983, and recognized as a biosphere reserve by the UNESCO on 17 December 1990.

From 1994 to 1999, the World Bank financed a project to develop a natural resources management model for the park.

Geography
The park's highest hill is djebel El-Ghorra at 1202 m. The average temperature goes from 9 °C to 30 °C. The park has 50 km of shores facing the Mediterranean Sea.

The park has 6 lakes:
Lake Oubeira (2200 ha)
Lake Tonga (2600 ha)
Lake Mellah (860 ha), the only lagoon in Algeria which communicates with the sea
Marais of Bourdim (11 ha)
Blue lake (3 ha)
Black lake (6 ha)

Biosphere
The El Kala National Park and Biosphere Reserve is home to 40 species of mammals, 25 bird of prey species, 64 freshwater bird species and 9 marine bird species.  The Barbary stag is prevalent in the park.

An investigation led between 1996 and 2010 listed 1590 different types of vegetables in the park and 718 animal species. The main tree species are the Quercus suber (dominant), the Zeen oak, the Quercus coccifera, the Aleppo pine, the glutinous Alder, Willows, the White Poplar. Other tree species in the park include Eucalyptus, Acacias, Maritime pines and bald cypresses. 175 species of mushrooms were listed.

The park is threatened by the creation of a highway in Algeria which would threaten the rare animals and plants of the park. It has been proposed that the highway should avoid this region and go further south.

Gallery

Human population
87,000 people live in the El Kala National Park and Biosphere Reserve.

Tourism
The park averaged 30,000 visitors in 2001.

References

External links
Park data on UNEP-WPMC
 A petition for the preservation of the park
 A website about the park, including a map

National parks of Algeria
Ramsar sites in Algeria
Geography of El Taref Province
Protected areas established in 1993
Biosphere reserves of Algeria
Tourist attractions in El Taref Province
1993 establishments in Algeria